Bangladesh Police Service Association - BPSA is the association of the BCS cadre police officers of Bangladesh.

History 
In January 2008, Nabo Bikram Kishore Tripura, Additional Inspector-General of Police, and Mahbubur Rahman, superintendent of police of Dhaka District, became the President and General Secretary of the Bangladesh Police Service Association respectively.

In January 2011, A. K. M. Shahidul Haque, Additional Inspector-General of Police, and Monirul Islam, Assistant Commissioner of Detective Branch, became the President and General Secretary of the Bangladesh Police Service Association respectively.

In July 2017, Bangladesh Police Service Association defended police offers actions over detaining Upazila Nirbahi Officer of Barisal Tariq Salmon over publishing a distorted image of President Sheikh Mujibur Rahman. The actions of the police were criticized by Bangladesh Administrative Service Association and officers in question were withdrawn from service.

In 2018, Asaduzzaman Mia, Police commissioner of Dhaka Metropolitan Police, and Muhammad Harun Or Rashid, superintendent of police, was the President and General Secretary of the Bangladesh Police Service Association respectively. The Bangladesh Police Service Association and the Bangladesh Administrative Service Association had a reunion in July 2018 and agreed to work together. On 27 December 2018, Bangladesh Police Service Association criticized Dr Kamal Hossain over his comments against police officers.

In February 2019, Benazir Ahmed, Director General of Rapid Action Battalion, and Proloy Kumar Joarder, Deputy Commissioner of Counter Terrorism and Transnational Crime Unit became the President and General Secretary of the Bangladesh Police Service Association respectively.

In January 2020, Shafiqul Islam, Police commissioner of Dhaka Metropolitan Police, and Mohammad Jayedul Alam, Superintendent of Police in Narayanganj District, became the President and General Secretary of the Bangladesh Police Service Association respectively. Bangladesh Police Service Association defended the police force in the wake of the murder of retired major Sinha Mohammed Rashed Khan by some police officers.

In February 2021, Bangladesh Police Service Association criticized the report by Al Jazeera on corruption in Bangladesh and titled "All the Prime Minister's men".

On 26 June 2021 Monirul Islam, Additional Inspector-General of Police of the Special Branch and Md Asaduzzaman, Deputy Commissioner (Gulshan) of Dhaka Metropolitan Police became the President and General Secretary of the Bangladesh Police Service Association respectively.

In December 2021, Bangladesh Police Service Association criticized the United States sanctions against Bangladesh security personals, including former President of the Association Benazir Ahmed.

See also 

 Bangladesh Judicial Service Association
 Bangladesh Administrative Service Association

References 

Bangladesh Police
Politics of Bangladesh
Organisations based in Dhaka
Trade associations based in Bangladesh
Trade unions in Bangladesh